White Chicks is a 2004 American comedy film directed by Keenen Ivory Wayans from a screenplay co-written by Wayans, Xavier Cook, Andy McElfresh, Michael Anthony Snowden, with additional contributions by and starring Marlon Wayans and Shawn Wayans. It also stars Jaime King, Frankie Faison, Lochlyn Munro, and John Heard. In the film, two FBI agents go undercover as women by using whiteface to protect two hotel heiresses from a kidnapping plot targeting socialites.

Principal photography for White Chicks took place in Chilliwack and Victoria in British Columbia, and in The Hamptons in New York. It was theatrically released in the United States on June 23, 2004. The film received generally negative reviews upon release, and was nominated for five Golden Raspberry Awards, including Worst Picture. It grossed over $113.1 million worldwide, and has since come to be regarded as a cult classic.

Plot

Two FBI agent brothers, Marcus Anthony II and Kevin Copeland unsuccessfully try to collar a drug dealer by selling their product disguised as ice cream. They are eventually offered a reprieve if they escort the sisters Brittany and Tiffany Wilson safely to a weekend-long fashion event in The Hamptons; the rich but shallow socialite daughters of Wilson Cruiseliners CEO Andrew Wilson, whom the police are suspicious that they will become the next victims in a string of high-profile kidnappings. However on the drive, the Wilson sisters' dog leaps out of the vehicle's window, causing Kevin to reach for its leash to save it, losing control of the vehicle, causing an accident where the sisters suffer minor facial scars. With the Wilsons refusing to be seen in such imperfect condition, Kevin, fearing for their jobs, scares the girls into staying at a hotel while he and Marcus disguise themselves as the sisters and attend the event.

Kevin as Brittany, and Marcus as Tiffany, acquaint themselves with the sisters' three best friends – Lisa Anderson, Karen Googlestein, and Tori Wilson – and encounter their rivals: the Vandergeld sisters, Heather and Megan. Unbeknownst to Kevin and Marcus, the sisters are being monitored by their colleagues, Vincent Gomez and Jake Harper, and their boss, Chief Elliott Gordon, who are undercover posing as hotel staff. At the hotel, pro basketball player Latrell Spencer, who has an assistant named Tony, is attracted to Marcus/Tiffany, and Kevin takes a shine to New York One News reporter, Denise Porter.

At one of the Vandergelds' annual charity auction party that night, Latrell wins a dinner date with Marcus/Tiffany, while Kevin pretends to be Latrell to attract Denise, after hearing that she likes rich men. While the real Latrell takes Marcus/Tiffany to the La Bella restaurant, Kevin uses Latrell's car to drive Denise to Latrell's house, where he begins to solicit information about Ted Burton turning the tables on Warren Vandergeld, Heather and Megan's father. With Kevin becoming romantically involved with Denise and Marcus/Tiffany trying to reject Latrell to no avail, their combined antics put them under Gomez and Harper's suspicion.

At a nightclub, after winning a dance-off against the Vandergelds, Kevin and Marcus learn from a drunken and heartbroken Karen that Warren Vandergeld is actually penniless and has been taking loans from her father, causing them both to realize that Warren is the mastermind behind the kidnappings. The next day, the real Brittany and Tiffany arrive at the hotel and find out that they are being impersonated. As they arrive in the Hamptons to reveal their "clones", so do Marcus' wife, Gina, and her friend, Shaunice, having assumed that Marcus is cheating on Gina. Gomez and Harper also conclude that the Wilsons are being impersonated by two men and aim to expose them, only to inappropriately strip down the real Brittany and Tiffany in front of Gordon by accident where Tiffany punches Harper in the face. They are subsequently suspended, and a furious Gordon fires Kevin and Marcus after he discovers the truth. Having lost both his job and possibly Gina, Marcus snaps at Kevin for his renegade ways, always dragging him into trouble.

Later, Kevin and Marcus discover that Warren had funneled large sums of money through his modest charity. Marcus stops Kevin from notifying Gordon, convincing him that they should personally intervene to redeem themselves, and they contact Gomez and Harper to help resolve the case. Again making-up as the Wilson sisters, they are chosen to appear in the event's final fashion show, and the Vandergelds are furious that they were kicked off the catwalk by the boss, Aubrey, in favor of the Copelands/Wilsons, but the real Brittany and Tiffany also perform in the event. Karen rejects Heath who callously snubbed her which makes Marcus punch him in the face. During the show, the Vandergeld sisters try to sabotage their "rivals", but end up being humiliated by Karen, Lisa and Tori, who discovered them on the scaffolding above the catwalk.

The real Brittany and Tiffany appear and reveal Kevin and Marcus to be imposters, thus causing mass confusion between the group and the audience. Warren uses the opportunity to begin the kidnapping. However, Warren incorrectly captures Marcus/Tiffany and Brittany, which begins a fight between the Copeland brothers and Heath and Russ, a pair of friends Warren hired to get involved with the girls and aid in the kidnappings. Warren soon captures the real sisters and explains his financial troubles to his wife, Elaine, and daughters (who are dismayed to find out that they are broke) not knowing that Denise and her cameraman are recording his confession. In the ensuing fight, Kevin is nearly shot trying to protect Denise, Latrell is shot trying to protect Marcus/Tiffany, and Warren is shot in the shoulder by Kevin.

Marcus and Kevin successfully capture Warren while Gomez and Harper apprehend Heath and Russ. Afterward, their true identities are revealed to all, and Latrell is dismayed that Marcus is not actually white but he does not seem to care that Marcus is actually a man. While Warren, Heath and Russ are arrested, Gordon reinstates the Copeland brothers, Gomez, and Harper. Marcus clears things with Gina, Kevin and Denise begin a relationship, and Latrell wins over the real Brittany and Tiffany. Tori, Lisa, and Karen admit they liked Brittany and Tiffany a lot more when Marcus and Kevin were them. The five agree to remain friends and go shopping on the next day together.

Cast

 Shawn Wayans as Kevin Copeland / Brittany Wilson
 Marlon Wayans as Marcus Anthony Copeland II / Tiffany Wilson
 Jaime King as Heather Vandergeld
 Busy Philipps as Karen Googlestein
 Jennifer Carpenter as Lisa Anderson
 Jessica Cauffiel as Tori Wilson
 John Heard as Warren Vandergeld
 Brittany Daniel as Megan Vandergeld
 Terry Crews as Latrell Spencer
 Frankie Faison as Chief Elliott Gordon
 Lochlyn Munro as Agent Jake Harper
 Eddie Velez as Agent Vincent Gomez
 Rochelle Aytes as Denise Porter
 Maitland Ward as Brittany Wilson
 Anne Dudek as Tiffany Wilson
 Faune A. Chambers as Gina Copeland
 Drew Sidora as Shaunice
 John Reardon as Heath
 Steven Grayhm as Russ
 Casey Lee as Tony

Production
Filming occurred partly in Chilliwack, British Columbia, including the exterior scenes at the Hamptons and Victoria, British Columbia. Director Keenen Ivory Wayans also co-wrote and co-produced the film with his brothers.

Soundtrack

 "Latin Thugs" – Cypress Hill
 "Hey Ms. Wilson" – The Penfifteen Club
 "Shake It (Like a White Girl)" – Jesse Jaymes (Copeland)
 "A Thousand Miles" – Vanessa Carlton
 "Realest Niggas" – 50 Cent, Notorious B.I.G.
 "White Girls" – Mighty Casey
 "Dance City" – Oscar Hernandez
 "Trouble" – P!nk
 "U Can't Touch This" – MC Hammer
 "Dance, Dance, Dance" – The Beach Boys
 "Guantanamera" – Jose Fernandez Diaz
 "It's My Life" – No Doubt
 "(I Got That) Boom Boom" – Britney Spears featuring Ying Yang Twins
 "Bounce" (The Bandit Club Remix) – Stock, IC Green
 "Get Low" – Lil Jon & The East Side Boyz featuring Ying Yang Twins
 "Crazy in Love" – Beyoncé featuring Jay-Z
 "It's Tricky" – Run–D.M.C.
 "This Love" – Maroon 5
 "No Control" – Blackfire
 "I Wanna Know" – Joe
 "Tipsy" – J-Kwon
 "Satisfaction" – Benny Benassi
 "Let's Get It Started" – Black Eyed Peas
 "Move Your Feet" – Junior Senior
 "I Need Your Love Tonight" – Elvis Presley
 "Girls Just Want to Have Fun" – Cyndi Lauper
 "TRU Homies" - TRU

Release
White Chicks was theatrically released in the United States on June 23, 2004. Columbia TriStar Home Entertainment released the DVD in the United States on October 26, 2004 later it was also in UMD on November 29 2005.

Reception

Box office
The film grossed $19.7 million in its opening weekend, taking the #2 spot. It finished with $70.8 million at the box office in the United States, and $42.3 million in other territories, for a worldwide total of $113.1 million, against a budget of $37 million. The film was released in the United Kingdom on October 15, 2004, and opened at #2, behind Shark Tale.

Critical response
The film was "largely panned" by critics upon release. On Rotten Tomatoes, the film has an approval rating of 15% based on 126 reviews and an average rating of 3.9/10, with the site's consensus stating that the film is a "scattershot comedy that's silly and obvious." On Metacritic, the film has a score of 41 out of 100 based on 31 critics, indicating "mixed or average reviews". Audiences polled by CinemaScore gave the film an average grade of "B+" on an A+ to F scale.

In his negative review, Dave Kehr of New York Times stated that "Most movies require some suspension of disbelief. But White Chicks... requires something more radical than that. A full frontal lobotomy might be a good place to start." Film critic Richard Roeper put the film at #1 on his list of the worst films of 2004, amongst claims of unconvincing prosthetics and racism. Roger Ebert of the Chicago Sun-Times gave the film 1 and  stars out of four and said "Here is a film so dreary and conventional that it took an act of the will to keep me in the theater." He subsequently named the film the seventh worst film of 2004. Owen Gleiberman from Entertainment Weekly said "A tawdry excuse for a movie, but it has a handful of shameless giggles", and rated the film "C+".

David Rooney of Variety gave a positive review, and stated that the film "scores more hits than misses." USA Todays Mike Clark rated it 3/4, and said "As with every other genre, there's a right way and a wrong way to handle dude-lawman comedies. Chicks does it right a lot of the time."

White Chicks was nominated for five Razzies, including Worst Picture, Worst Actress for the Wayans brothers in drag, Worst Director, Worst Screenplay and Worst Screen Couple. It lost in all categories to Catwoman and Fahrenheit 9/11. At the 2004 Stinkers Bad Movie Awards, the film received nominations for Worst Picture, Worst Director (Keenan Ivory Wayans), Most Painfully Unfunny Comedy, Worst On-Screen Couple (Shawn and Marlon Wayans), and Least "Special" Special Effects. Its only win was for Most Painfully Unfunny Comedy.

Possible sequel

In August 2009, a sequel to the film was announced by Sony, though they later canceled the project. In April 2014, Marlon Wayans expressed interest in a sequel. A sequel was confirmed to be in the works in March 2018. On June 30, 2019, Terry Crews confirmed a sequel on the program Watch What Happens Live. Marlon Wayans confirmed that this information was not meant to leak, and that the deal had not yet been confirmed.

See also
 Cross-dressing in film and television
 Nuns on the Run, a comedy film of 1990 starring Eric Idle and Robbie Coltrane. It tells a similar story, in which two criminals pose as nuns to hide from a rival gang.
 Some Like It Hot, a comedy film of 1959 starring Tony Curtis and Jack Lemmon as two male musicians dressing as women to hide from gangsters in Florida.

References

External links

 
 
 
 
 

2004 films
2000s buddy comedy films
2000s buddy cop films
2000s police comedy films
African-American comedy films
American buddy comedy films
American buddy cop films
American crime comedy films
Columbia Pictures films
Cross-dressing in American films
Films about the Federal Bureau of Investigation
Films about race and ethnicity
Films directed by Keenen Ivory Wayans
Films scored by Teddy Castellucci
Films set in New York (state)
Films shot in British Columbia
American police detective films
Revolution Studios films
Films set in hotels
2004 comedy films
2000s English-language films
2000s American films